Alberto Brignoli (born 19 August 1991) is an Italian professional footballer who plays as a goalkeeper for Greek Super League club Panathinaikos.

Club career

Early career
Born in Trescore Balneario, Brignoli made his debut as a senior with A.C. Montichiari in 2009, in Serie D, after representing Uesse Sarnico 1908 and USD Grumellese Calcio as a youth. After helping his side achieve promotion as a starter, he was loaned to A.C. Lumezzane.

Brignoli was loaned to Ternana Calcio for 2012–13 season. He made his professional debut on 1 September 2012, starting in a 0–1 home loss against Modena for the Serie B championship.

On 31 January 2013, Ternana signed Brignoli outright from Lumezzane. He continued to appear regularly for the club, achieving mid table positions in all campaigns.

Juventus
On 2 February 2015, Juventus signed Brignoli outright for €1.75 million, which saw the remaining 50% registration rights of Alberto Masi move in the opposite direction for €1.5 million. Brignoli returned to Terni immediately on loan for the rest of the season.

Sampdoria
On 2 July 2015, Brignoli was signed by Sampdoria in a temporary deal. He made his Serie A debut on 14 May 2016 (round 38 the last round), playing the full 90 minutes in a 0–5 away loss against his parent club.

CD Leganés
On 20 July 2016, Brignoli was loaned to La Liga club CD Leganés, for one year.

Perugia
On 11 January 2017, Brignoli returned to Italy, joining Perugia on loan.

Benevento
On 30 July 2017, Brignoli joined Serie A newcomers Benevento on a temporary deal, with an obligation to buy at the end of season. According to Corriere dello Sport – Stadio, the obligation would depend on Benevento securing a place in the 2018–19 Serie A season. He was assigned number 22 shirt. On 3 December, he scored a 95th-minute equaliser with a header in a 2–2 home draw against Milan, to earn Benevento their first ever point in Serie A after a record 14 consecutive defeats. With the goal, Brignoli was the third goalkeeper to score from open play in Serie A history after Michelangelo Rampulla in 1992 and Massimo Taibi in 2001.

Palermo
On 25 July 2018, Brignoli signed with Serie B club Palermo until 30 June 2021.

Empoli
On 18 July 2019, Brignoli signed for Serie B club Empoli for free. 
On 20 September 2021, Alberto Brignoli became the best goalkeeper in last year's Serie B as he helped his team, Empoli, rise to Serie A. "It was a great pleasure and honor to receive the award for best goalkeeper for last season. I want to thank my teammates, my coaches and the staff who gave me the opportunity to catch this performance."

Panathinaikos
On 31 August 2021, Panathinaikos signed Italian goalkeeper Alberto Brignoli from Empoli on a free transfer. The 1.88 tall goalkeeper who came out as the best goalkeeper in Serie B last year, joined  Panathinaikos as a free agent, with the Italians holding a resale rate according to various sources.

Career statistics

Club

Honours
Empoli
Serie B: 2020–21

Panathinaikos
Greek Cup: 2021–22
Individual
Serie B Goalkeeper of the season 2020–21

References

External links 
 
 
 
 AIC profile (data by football.it)  

1991 births
Sportspeople from the Province of Bergamo
Living people
Italian footballers
Association football goalkeepers
Serie A players
Serie B players
Serie D players
La Liga players
A.C. Montichiari players
F.C. Lumezzane V.G.Z. A.S.D. players
Ternana Calcio players
U.C. Sampdoria players
CD Leganés players
A.C. Perugia Calcio players
Benevento Calcio players
Palermo F.C. players
Empoli F.C. players
Italian expatriate footballers
Italian expatriate sportspeople in Spain
Italian expatriate sportspeople in Greece
Expatriate footballers in Spain
People from Trescore Balneario
Super League Greece players
Expatriate footballers in Greece
Panathinaikos F.C. players
Footballers from Lombardy